The Go-Backs are a tribe of elves in the comic series Elfquest. They named themselves from their goal to return to the Palace of the High Ones.
They are hunters (probably gatherers, too) and, above all, warriors. Most of them care neither for the past nor for the future. They are the only known tribe that scorns magic - especially healing magic, since knowing that a healer is around makes warriors 'soft'.
Their most notable tradition is dancing for their death.    

In the series Kahvi it is revealed that the Go-Backs were originally a splinter group of the Wolfriders, who had lost their wolf blood "because of Willowgreen's trickery." What exactly that looked like, or how exactly the Go-Backs became stag-riders and searchers for the palace, are yet untold stories. (A prose story about the healer Willowgreen and her "trickery" was to appear in the book "Hunter's Dawn" in the mid-1990s, but that volume was repeatedly delayed, then canceled.)

When the Go-Backs tried to return to the Palace, they were stopped by the Ice Trolls, who assumed that once the elves were reinstalled in the Palace they would enslave the trolls as their ancestors had. War ensued between the two groups and was underway when the Go-Backs rescued the Wolfriders and forged an alliance with them.

After the Palace is won, the Go-Backs stay near it, but not for long. When trolls captured Ekuar, Rayek blamed the Go-Backs, and banished them by creating a gorge which prevented them from crossing into the mountains. Kahvi became separated from the rest of her tribe, and goes to look for the palace Rayek spirited away, to take revenge. She stays with the Wolfriders for some years.

When she finally returns to the Go-Backs, Zey is their new chief.  She suggests raiding the Sun Village with a small party to steal the Little Palace. After this is a failure, Zey carries all-out war to Sorrow's End. Kahvi realizes that war is not a way to regain honor. She kills Zey, and leads the Go-Backs back to the Frozen Mountains, even without the Little Palace.
In the following, the Go-Backs return to their ways (minus the Palace-searching). Kahvi stays chief, but often leaves the tribe to her second-in-command Mardu, once to Blue Mountain trying to get a new trophy instead of the Palace for the tribe, discovering her own past, and once trying to find Cutter to bear his child.

There are several thousand years completely unmapped, but the most recent bits revealed seem like Kahvi one day just did not come back from one of her expeditions, and the Go-Backs split, some staying in the Frozen Mountains, others settling the New Land - Teir's people. The Go-Backs who stayed in the Frozen Mountains joined the other elves in the Palace after its second restoration; many of them joined Venka in her search for Kahvi.

Characters

Kahvi

Daughter of Willowgreen and (publicly) Two-Spear (though her mother Recognized his close friend and cousin Greywolf), mother of daughters Vaya and Venka, and recently proven to be the mother of Teir, and possibly many more children. Lovemate of Rayek, Cutter, Tyldak, and Vok. Kahvi is bold and outspoken, a fierce warrior, though occasionally careless in battle. Kahvi is (barely) capable of love, though she rarely displays it openly, and is not above manipulating those who care about her. Nevertheless, she is a chieftain beloved by her people. She also has a disdain for magic, like many of her tribe. Left for dead after challenging her father for chief, she was revived long after, being preserved in a magic pool inside the caves where Two-Spear's tribe lived. The pool possibly had a hand in cleansing her of her wolf blood and awakening her magic potential. 

When she awoke, she had no memories of her life prior, and so was trained by Sharf, the leader of the Go-Backs, to be the next chief.  After inheriting the chief's braids upon Sharf's death, she led the Go-Backs for many years, though most of the time she would travel alone and allow others to lead.  She gave birth to and raised two daughters, Vaya (who was killed during the Troll/Elf war for the palace) and Venka (fathered by her one-time lovemate, Rayek).  During the Wolfriders' long sleep, she traveled with her lovemate Tyldak and was later joined by Tyldak's son, Windkin. During an attack by humans, Tyldak was mortally wounded and bled to death in Khavi's arms.  Afterwards, she persuaded Windkin to sire a child on her, to have a small, living part of Tyldak.  However, when she gave birth to her son, Teir, she immediately abandoned him to tribemates to raise, as she had really wanted a daughter. Years later, tired of her long life, she allowed herself to be hunted, and killed by, the human Lehrigen, allowing him to take her braids as a trophy he carried with him the rest of his life. She had long brown hair with double braids on each side (chief's braids) and green eyes.

Arri
A female elf with light brown hair. When Chot reported the failed attempt to steal the Little Palace, she remembered the Tunnel of Golden Light from Rayek's stories, making it possible that the Go-Backs attacked Sorrow's End

Chot
A good friend of Zey. He went with Kahvi to steal the Little Palace, but betrayed her. In the war for the Little Palace he was gravely wounded, and sealed in a Preserver's cocoon until a healer could help. Later he stayed with the Sun Folk. He was made to go with Dart's party to the Forevergreen. Over times he made friends with Jethel, and when Jethel did not join the other elves in the palace, Chot decided to look for him instead of joining the others.
Appears in Going Back, the main body of New Blood and in Fire Eye.

Jirda
A female elf with brown hair and brown eyes. She was young when Kahvi returned with Tyldak to the Go-Backs after the Palace was lost, and shot at them. Despite that, she is rather timid for a Go-Back. Appeared in Going Back.

Mardu
She became Kahvi's second-in-command after the war in Sorrow's End. It seems like she was the one actually taking care of the tribe, while their chief went to more or less crazy expeditions. She was at first the only one Kahvi trusted with the secret that the Go-Backs used to be Wolfriders.
In Going Back she is depicted with light brown hair and brown eyes, but on a center-spread, she has red hair.
Appears in Going Back and Kahvi.

Trof
He has a magic talent: telekinesis. Unfortunately, he does not have it entirely under control: When the Go-Backs were celebrating the capture of the Egg, he made it float out of the den, enabling Tyldak to steal it. However, the same talent helped get it back.
Appears in Kahvi

Vok
Lovemate of Kahvi. He is a kind of bard to the Go-Backs; he is often seen playing a flute, and also in charge of "writing" songs about great deeds. Possible father of Vaya.
Appears in the original series and in Kahvi.

Zey
Zey became chief of the Go-Backs after they lost the Palace to Rayek. After Kahvi said she could bring back a piece of the Palace, he was afraid she would take over the tribe again, and more or less told his friend Chot to make sure she would not come back. After Chot reports Kahvi's death, he leads the Go-Backs to a brutal raid of Sorrow's end. Kahvi killed him, ending the fight for the Little Palace.

He has dark red hair and light brown eyes. He is possibly the child of Mardu.
Appears in Going Back and New Blood.

Others
Vaya - Kahvi's first daughter and a lovemate of Pike, a Wolfrider. She was killed by trolls during the first war, sacrificing herself to save Pike, her mother, and the others. Two-Edge dressed her body in special metal armor he constructed for the elves, showing the Go-Back/Wolfrider war party how to use the armor.
Cheider - appears in Going Back and Kahvi
Jekko - one of the Go-Backs who attacked Sorrow's End. He was killed by Dart.Appears in New Blood #12
Klagg - He challenged Kahvi after she returned without success from her search for Cutter.Appears in Kahvi
Roff - A relatively plump elf. Kahvi scolds him when she returned after the Palace was lost for eating troll meat (something the Go-Backs had given up after winning the Palace)Appears in Going Back
Shurka - He is killed by a snow bear, leading to a hunt at the beginning of Kahvi
Venka - While Kahvi's daughter, she has been raised among Wolfriders, and seems to consider herself more one of them. She believes her destiny will be intertwined with the fate of the Go-Backs, however.
Tyldak is actually a Glider, but while living with the Wolfriders, he became lovemate of Kahvi. After that he stayed with her, and so (at least sometimes) with the Go-Backs.
Urda- A female elf with silver hair and blue eyes, She was Kahvi's original second in command. She was left in charge of the tribe when Kahvi left with Venka, but was captured by a party of trolls and taken underground. She was presumably killed, as nothing has been seen or heard of her since. Appears in Siege at Blue Mountain and in Kings of the Broken Wheel.
Krim- A female elf in the original series that ended up joining the Wolfriders alongside Skot. She wanted to see the forests the Wolfriders spoke of, and ended up staying. She is lifemated to both Pike and Skot, lovemated with Shenshen, and bears a son called Sust. She has short blonde hair and blue eyes.
Skot- A male elf with long dark brown hair and brown eyes, lifemate of Pike and Krim,  lovemate of Shenshen. He went with Krim to see the Wolfrider's forests, but ended up saying. He is the presumed father of Sust, and the evidence is strongly in that favor, as Sust seems unable to make wolf-friend. Skot dies during the Shards War, burned alive while fighting the Peace Hounds. He was not considered very intelligent, but loved children and his own bravado.
Yun- the daughter of Wolfrider Skywise and an unnamed Go-Back, raised among the Go-Backs, Yun later joined Ember's tribe.
Elfquest